Early Recordings are the early recordings of Uncle Dave Macon, released in 2001 and recorded between 1924-1925.

Reception

Eugene Chadbourne of Allmusic called it a "the real deal, a dozen monumental tracks lifted off the original 78 slabs that comprised the early-recording career of this eccentric and almost endlessly amusing old-time country star. Practically every track is some kind of classic."

Track listing
 "Old Man's Last Hope" – 2:29
 "Keep My Skillet Good and Greasy" – 2:28
 "Hill-Billie Blues" – 2:51
 "All I've Got's Gone" – 2:36
 "The Fox Chase" – 2:42
 "Papa's Billie Goat" – 2:44
 "The Old Log Cabin In The Lane" – 2:46
 "She Was Always Chewing Gum" – 2:51
 "I'm Going To Leave You Love" – 2:53
 "Jonah And The Whale" – 3:05
 "Love Somebody (instrumental)" – 2:57
 "Soldier's Joy (instrumental)" – 2:51
 "Bile Them Cabbage Down" – 2:59
 "Down By The River" – 3:03
 "Run, Nigger, Run" – 2:52
 "Old Dan Tucker" – 3:02
 "Station Will Be Changed After A While" – 3:17
 "Rooster Crow Medley" – 3:00
 "Just From Tennessee" – 3:00
 "Watermelon Smilin' On A Vine" – 2:59
 "All Go Hungry Hash House" – 3:22
 "Oh, Where Is My Boy Tonight" – 2:44
 "From Jerusalem To Jericho" – 3:06
 "I Tickled Nancy" – 2:33

References

2001 albums
Uncle Dave Macon albums